The prime minister of Albania , officially styled Prime Minister of the Republic of Albania, is the head of government of the Republic of Albania and the most powerful and influential person in Albanian politics. The prime minister holds the executive power of the nation and represents the Council of Ministers and chairs its meetings.

The prime minister is appointed by the president of Albania after each general election and must have the confidence of the Parliament of Albania to stay in office. The Council is responsible for carrying out both foreign and domestic policies. It directs and controls the activities of the ministries and other state organs. The prime minister is elected on the basis of universal suffrage, through a secret ballot, for a four-year term.  The Constitution of Albania sets no limit as to office terms of the prime minister.

The 33rd and current officeholder is Edi Rama of the Socialist Party who was elected on 23 June 2013 and started his first four-year-term on 13 September 2013.

Powers, duties and responsibilities 

The prime minister of the Albania, officially styled Prime Minister of the Republic of Albania, is the most powerful and influential state officeholder in the Albanian system of government.

One important role of the president is to designate a candidate for the office of prime minister who, in the opinion of the president, is best able to command a majority of the members of the Parliament. As head of government, the prime minister is charged with directing the internal policy of the country and leads the public administration. In this regard, the government cooperates with other interested social actors. If the prime minister is temporarily absent or incapable of exercising its executive power, the deputy prime minister takes over his functions, such as chairing the cabinet and the council of ministers.

The Constitution states that the prime minister represents the council of ministers and chairs its meetings, outlines and presents the principal general policies of the state and is responsible for them, assures the implementation of legislation and policies approved by the Council of Ministers, coordinates and supervises the work of the members of the Council of Ministers and other institutions of the central state administration, performs other duties contemplated in the Constitution and laws, resolves disagreements among ministers, and issues orders in the exercise of his powers. The prime minister can also initiate a proceeding of the Constitutional Court of Albania.

Oath 
Before assuming duty, the prime minister-elect is required to take an oath of office before the President, swearing loyalty to the Constitution. The text of the oath in its Albanian form is sensitive to gender and all nouns always retain a neutral form. The prime minister-elect takes the following oath of office, specified by the Constitution:

Office and residence 

The Prime Minister's Office is the official office and residence of the prime minister. It provides secretarial assistance to the prime minister. The prime minister through his office coordinates with all ministers in the central union cabinet, minister of independent charges and governors and ministers of state government. Furthermore informal meetings between the prime minister and other government or foreign officials takes place in the Office. It also consists of the immediate staff of the prime minister of Albania, as well as multiple levels of support staff reporting to the prime minister. Since 1941, the building serves as the office and residence of the prime minister. The building is in the capital city of Tirana at the Dëshmorët e Kombit Boulevard, near the Mother Teresa Square.

The building was planned by the Italian architects Florestano Di Fausto and Gherardo Bosio, and constructed together with the Dëshmorët e Kombit Boulevard, the Mother Teresa Square and all the buildings located on these squares, during the Italian occupation of Albania in 1939 to 1941, in a Rationalist style.

List of prime ministers (1912–present)

See also 
 List of Albanian monarchs
 List of heads of state of Albania
 Deputy Prime Minister of Albania

Notes

References 

 
Politics of Albania
Government of Albania
Albania